Ivan Graf (born 17 June 1987) is a Croatian footballer who plays as a defender.

Club career
Born in capital city of Croatia, Zagreb, Graf started his football path in football school of local city based lower league Kustošija football club where he spent his entire youth career. With Kustošija he also kicked off his senior career in 2006–07 season which was his first senior competitive season. After debut season with Kustošija he decided to leave his domestic club on a free transfer and joined another lower league city club, neighbouring Vrapče on a two-year contract for the start of 2007–08 season. Graf spent two seasons in row with Vrapče and by the end of 2008–09 season with his two-year contract completed he decided not to extend his contract and stay at Vrapče. He felt as a free player it was time to move on and to change the domain of Croatian lower league football after playing it for three seasons.

Primorje Ajdovščina
Therefore, joining Slovenian club Primorje Ajdovščina the following season was seen as uncommon move due to general opinion at the time that Slovenian football was limited compared to Croatian one in almost all aspects of football such as tactics, training, style of play, finance, managing, fan base and overall status of football and was not attractive enough for Croatian football players whose financial demands were higher. However, Graf made a firm decision to join NK Primorje Ajdovščina due to initiative from Primorje head coach Vjekoslav Lokica. Croatian coach Lokica after tight relegation from Slovenian PrvaLiga in 2008–09 season was preparing the team for express comeback and saw in young Graf a key figure to secure the promotion. NK Primorje was seen till then for a number of seasons as a stable Slovenian first division club and with Graf in defence they achieved the goal, becoming Slovenian Second League Champions with only two games lost and sixteen goals conceded in entire 2009–10 season winning so promotion to Slovenian PrvaLiga for 2010–11 season in style. In October 2010, it was announced that the salaries of him along with four other players were due. As a result, he started a legal procedure. He was also linked to a transfer to fellow Slovenian club Domžale.

In March 2011, he moved to Ukrainian club Tavriya on a two year contract and became the sixth signing for the club in the winter transfer window. In October, his contract was terminated by mutual consent.

Graf returned to Croatia in 2012 and signed for Lučko on an undisclosed fee. In 2013, he was transferred to Zagreb. In July, he joined fellow Croatian club Istra 1961. He made his debut in a 3–1 victory against Osijek where he scored a goal in the 59th minute.

Kazakhstan
Graf joined Kazakhstan Premier League team FC Irtysh Pavlodar at the start of the 2015 season, being told he could leave the club in July 2015, before signing a new one-year deal with Irtysh Pavlodar in January 2016. Prior to the 2016 season, Graf joined FC Kaisar. On 4 February 2021, Graf joined Shakhter Karagandy from Kaisar. On 29 January 2023, Graf signed a contract with FC Kyzylzhar.

References

External links

1987 births
Living people
Footballers from Zagreb
Association football defenders
Croatian footballers
NK Kustošija players
NK Vrapče players
NK Primorje players
SC Tavriya Simferopol players
NK Lučko players
NK Zagreb players
NK Istra 1961 players
FC Irtysh Pavlodar players
FC Kaisar players
FC Shakhter Karagandy players
Slovenian Second League players
Slovenian PrvaLiga players
Ukrainian Premier League players
Croatian Football League players
First Football League (Croatia) players
Kazakhstan Premier League players
Croatian expatriate footballers
Expatriate footballers in Slovenia
Expatriate footballers in Ukraine
Expatriate footballers in Kazakhstan
Croatian expatriate sportspeople in Slovenia
Croatian expatriate sportspeople in Ukraine
Croatian expatriate sportspeople in Kazakhstan